Rocky Mountain House was a provincial electoral district in Alberta, Canada, mandated to return a single member to the Legislative Assembly of Alberta from 1940 to 2012.

History
The district was one of 83 current districts mandated to return a single member to the Legislative Assembly of Alberta using the first past the post method of voting since 1959. Prior to that Single Transferable Vote was in use but no election went to a second count.

The district which was located in central western rural Alberta was created from parts of four electoral districts in the 1940 boundary redistribution. It is named after the town of Rocky Mountain House.

The district was favourable to electing Progressive Conservative candidates since 1971. It was only held by four representatives.

The district was replaced in the 2010 Alberta electoral boundary re-distribution with Rimbey-Rocky Mountain House-Sundre.

Boundary history

Electoral history
The electoral district of Rocky Mountain House was created from parts of four different districts in the 1940 boundary re-distribution. The first election held that year saw Social Credit incumbent Alfred Hooke switch from the Red Deer provincial electoral district. He won his second term in office easily defeating two other candidates on the first ballot.

Hooke would be appointed to the first of his many cabinet portfolios as Provincial Secretary by Premier Ernest Manning in 1943. He would run for a third term and his first with ministerial advantage in the 1944 general election winning a larger majority. In 1945 Hooke also became the Minister of Economic Affairs.

The 1948 general election saw Hooke win his fourth straight term in office and third in the district, with a landslide over Co-operative Commonwealth candidate Ray Schmidt. Hooke won re-election five more times in 1952, 1955, 1959, 1963 and 1967.

Pundits had been predicting that Hooke would be defeated in the 1967 general election after a rift grew in the Social Credit party when national Social Credit leader Robert Thompson nominated an independent candidate to run against Hooke. He won the election easily. Hooke served in cabinet until 1968 when Harry Strom became Premier. He was not invited back to cabinet and retired at dissolution of the assembly in 1971.

The second representative in the district was elected in the 1971 general election. Progressive Conservative candidate Helen Hunley defeated Social Credit Harvey Staudinger to pick up the seat for her party. She was appointed to the first cabinet of Premier Peter Lougheed after the election. Hunley was re-elected in the 1975 defeating Staudinger for the second time with a larger victory. She remained in cabinet and retired from the legislature at dissolution in 1979. Hunley would be appointed remained in politics as she was appointed Lieutenant Governor in 1985.

Hunley was replaced in the legislature by Progressive Conservative candidate John Campbell in the 1979 general election. He won election twice more in 1982 and 1986 with large majorities.

The last representative in the district is Progressive Conservative MLA Ty Lund. Lund won the seat in the 1989 election for the first time with a landslide margin to hold the seat for his party. He was re-elected with a bigger majority in the 1993 election. Premier Ralph Klein appointed Lund to cabinet for the first time on September 15, 1994 as Minister of Environment.

He was re-elected four more times in 1997, 2001, 2004 and 2008. He kept serving various cabinet portfolio's until Premier Ed Stelmach took office in 2006.

The riding is notable for the electoral performances of Social Credit candidate Lavern Ahlstrom, who would later lead the party. Despite the party's minor status in recent times, Ahlstrom consistently polled well above his party's average in the elections he contested.

Election results

1940 general election

1944 general election

1948 general election

1952 general election

1955 general election

1959 general election

1963 general election

1967 general election

1971 general election

1975 general election

1979 general election

1982 general election

1986 general election

1989 general election

1993 general election

1997 general election

2001 general election

2004 general election

2008 general election

Alberta Senate election

2004 Senate nominee election district results

Voters had the option of selecting 4 Candidates on the Ballot

Plebiscite results

1948 Electrification Plebiscite
District results from the first province-wide plebiscite on electricity regulation.

1957 liquor plebiscite

On October 30, 1957 a stand-alone plebiscite was held province wide in all 50 of the then current provincial electoral districts in Alberta. The government decided to consult Alberta voters to decide on liquor sales and mixed drinking after a divisive debate in the Legislature. The plebiscite was intended to deal with the growing demand for reforming antiquated liquor control laws.

The plebiscite was conducted in two parts. Question A asked in all districts, asked the voters if the sale of liquor should be expanded in Alberta, while Question B asked in a handful of districts within the corporate limits of Calgary and Edmonton asked if men and woman were allowed to drink together in establishments.

Province wide Question A of the plebiscite passed in 33 of the 50 districts while Question B passed in all five districts. Rocky Mountain House voted in favour of the proposal by a narrow majority. Voter turnout in the district was very low, falling well under the province wide average of 46%. This decline in turnout was attributed to heavy rains, high winds and flooding conditions in the district that kept people away from polling stations.

Official district returns were released to the public on December 31, 1957. The Social Credit government in power at the time did not considered the results binding. However the results of the vote led the government to repeal all existing liquor legislation and introduce an entirely new Liquor Act.

Municipal districts lying inside electoral districts that voted against the Plebiscite were designated Local Option Zones by the Alberta Liquor Control Board and considered effective dry zones, business owners that wanted a license had to petition for a binding municipal plebiscite in order to be granted a license.

2004 Student Vote

On November 19, 2004 a Student Vote was conducted at participating Alberta schools to parallel the 2004 Alberta general election results. The vote was designed to educate students and simulate the electoral process for persons who have not yet reached the legal majority. The vote was conducted in 80 of the 83 provincial electoral districts with students voting for actual election candidates. Schools with a large student body that reside in another electoral district had the option to vote for candidates outside of the electoral district then where they were physically located.

See also
List of Alberta provincial electoral districts
Rocky Mountain House, Alberta a town in central Alberta

References

Further reading

External links
Elections Alberta
The Legislative Assembly of Alberta

Former provincial electoral districts of Alberta